Extra, Vol. 2 is a rarities double album by KMFDM. It was released on August 5, 2008. It is the second of a three volume, double-disc set collection of tracks that were not included in any of the ten KMFDM Classic albums.

Track listing

Disc one

Disc two

References

External links
Extra, Vol. 2 at the official KMFDM website
Extra, Vol. 2 at Metropolis Records

KMFDM compilation albums
2008 compilation albums
Metropolis Records compilation albums
Sequel albums